The 1934 British Empire Games were the second edition of what is now known as the Commonwealth Games, held in England, from 4–11 August 1934. The host city was London, with the main venue at Wembley Park, although the track cycling events were in Manchester. Seventeen national teams took part, including the Irish Free State (the only Games in which they participated, although an all-Ireland team competed at the 1930 Games).

The 1934 Games had been originally awarded to Johannesburg, South Africa, but the change of venue to London was made due to concerns regarding the treatment of black and Asian athletes by South African officials and fans.

Six sports were featured in the Games: athletics in White City Stadium; boxing, wrestling, and aquatics (swimming and diving) in the Empire Pool and Arena, Wembley; cycling in Fallowfield Stadium, Manchester; and lawn bowls at Paddington and Temple. Events for women athletes included a debut in athletics; the previous games had women's events only in swimming and diving.

Participating teams

(Teams participating for the first time in bold).

 
 
 
 
 
 
 
  Irish Free State*
 
 
 
 *
 
 
 
 
 

*The affiliation of Irish athletes at these games is unclear, see Ireland at the British Empire Games § 1934 games

Medals by country

Medals by event

Athletics

Boxing

Cycling

Track

Diving

Men's events

Women's events

Lawn bowls

All events were for men only.

Swimming

Men's

Women's

Wrestling
All events were for men only.

References

External links
 "London 1934". Thecgf.com. Commonwealth Games Federation.
 "Results and Medalists—1934 British Empire Games". Thecgf.com. Commonwealth Games Federation
 British Pathe: British Empire Games (1934)

 
British Empire Games
British Empire Games
British Empire Games, 1934
British Empire Games
Commonwealth Games in the United Kingdom
Commonwealth Games by year
British Empire Games